Scarborough is an electoral district of the Legislative Assembly in the Australian state of Western Australia.

The district is a coastal electorate based in the northern suburbs of Perth and is named for the suburb of Scarborough. It also includes the suburbs of Doubleview, Innaloo, Osborne Park and parts of the suburbs of City Beach, Gwelup, Karrinyup and Trigg.

Politically, the district is a marginal one. Based on the results of the 2005 state election, the seat was created with a Liberal Party majority of 52.4% to 47.6% versus the Labor Party.

History
Scarborough was first created at the 1972 redistribution, and was first contested at the 1974 election. Although typically a Liberal-held seat, it was won by the Labor Party at the 1983 and 1986 elections. The district was abolished at the 1996 election, largely replaced by the seat of Innaloo. Innaloo continued in the same trend as its predecessor, being won by Labor candidate John Quigley at the 2001 election before being abolished at the 2003 redistribution.

A new seat called Scarborough was created for the 2008 state election when the number of metropolitan seats was increased in accordance with the new one vote one value legislation. Scarborough was formed from the territory of two existing electorates: the southern end of Carine and the northern end of Churchlands.

Members for Scarborough

Election results

References

External links
 

Electoral districts of Western Australia